The following is a list of the Estonia national football team's competitive records and statistics.

Individual records

Player records

Players in bold are still active with Estonia.

Most appearances

Top goalscorers

Manager records

Team records

Competition records

FIFA World Cup

Draws include knockout matches decided via penalty shoot-out.

UEFA European Championship

Draws include knockout matches decided via penalty shoot-out.

UEFA Nations League

Olympic Games

Estonia's only participation in a major tournament was at the 1924 Summer Olympics in Paris, France. Coached by Hungarian Ferenc Kónya, Estonia's participation was limited to a single match in the first round as the team lost 0–1 to the United States, with Andy Straden scoring the winning goal from the penalty spot in the 15th minute. Estonia were also given a penalty and a chance to equalise, but Elmar Kaljot's effort struck the crossbar in the 68th minute. After going out of the tournament, the Estonian team stayed on in Paris for three weeks, playing a friendly match against Ireland, which ended in a 1–3 defeat, and then went to Germany, playing friendly matches against various teams including a 2–2 draw against 1. FC Kaiserslautern.

Baltic Cup

Milestones
 First World Cup qualification game: 11 June 1933, Stockholm, Sweden (6–2 loss) (first FIFA World Cup qualification match in history);
 First World Cup victory and also first away win: 19 August 1937, Turku, Finland (1–0);
 First European Championship qualifying game: 4 September 1994, Tallinn, Croatia (2–0 loss);
 First World Cup victory since return to independence: 5 October 1996, Tallinn, Belarus (1–0);
 First European Championship victory: 4 June 1998, Tallinn, Faroe Islands (5–0);
 First away win in the European Championship: 31 March 1999, Vilnius, Lithuania (2–1).

Head-to-head record 
The following table shows the Estonia national football team's all-time international record. 
Updated as of 12 January 2023.

See also
 Estonia national football team
Estonia national football team results (1920–1940)
Estonia national football team results (1991–2009)
Estonia national football team results (2010–2019)
Estonia national football team results (2020–present)

References

External links
 Official website 
 RSSSF archive of results since 1920

Estonia national football team
National association football team records and statistics